Pruggern is a former municipality in the district of Liezen in the Austrian state of Styria. Since the 2015 Styria municipal structural reform, it is part of the municipality Michaelerberg-Pruggern.

Geography
Pruggern lies in the Enns valley between Gröbming and Aich east of Schladming and not far from the entrance to the Sölk Pass.

References

Schladming Tauern
Cities and towns in Liezen District